Antonio Sansores Sastré (born 7 January 1964) is a Mexican politician affiliated with the PRD. As of 2013 he served as Deputy of the LXII Legislature of the Mexican Congress representing Tabasco.

References

1964 births
Living people
Politicians from Tabasco
Party of the Democratic Revolution politicians
21st-century Mexican politicians
People from Tenosique
Universidad Veracruzana alumni
Deputies of the LXII Legislature of Mexico
Members of the Chamber of Deputies (Mexico) for Tabasco